Santa Rosa de Calamuchita is a small village in the province of Córdoba, Argentina. The village is located in the center of the Calamuchita Valley, in the middle of a landscape that includes hills (the Sierras) as well as rivers and lakes; the area is a major tourist attraction. Other important nearby towns in the Valley are Villa General Belgrano and Embalse (the latter is home to a nuclear power plant).

External links

 Santa Rosa de Calamuchita Hotels
 Web site of Santa Rosa de Calamuchita
 Santa Rosa de Calamuchita - Official website.
 Pasta Restaurant in Santa Rosa de Calamuchita - Official website.
 

Populated places in Córdoba Province, Argentina
Tourism in Argentina
Cities in Argentina
Argentina
Córdoba Province, Argentina